Ghaly may refer to:

 Iyad Ag Ghaly (born c.1954), Tuareg militant against the Malian government
 Hossam Ghaly (born 1982), Egyptian footballer, has played for Egypt and clubs including Al Ahly, Feyenoord and Tottenham
 Mohamed Salah (born 1992), Egyptian footballer, currently plays for Liverpool and Egypt

See also
 Ghali (disambiguation)